The University of Wisconsin–Madison College of Agricultural and Life Sciences is one of the colleges of the University of Wisconsin–Madison. Founded in 1889, the college has 17 academic departments, 23 undergraduate majors, and 49 graduate programs.

CALS has an average undergraduate population of 3,300 students. It’s also home to over 800 graduate students pursuing masters and doctoral degrees. It offers majors in 25 areas, including Agriculture and Applied Economics, Biochemistry, Biology, Food Science, Science Communication, Genetics, and others. Undergraduate students are encouraged to participate in research programs. Students may also participate in a study-abroad program.

The College of Agricultural and Life Sciences receives $78.7 million in research funding comprising thousands of individual research projects, whose scope range from the fundamental challenges of science to the immediate problems and opportunities facing Wisconsin farms and businesses. It operates 12 agricultural research stations across the state.

The administrative offices of the college are in Agriculture Hall.

History 

John Rector Brown was the chair of the College. The school had a Rural Artists Program, including an Artist-in-Residence position which started when Brown was chair. John Steuart Curry was the first Artist-in-Residence. Current faculty members include lactation researcher Laura Hernandez.

Academic Departments and Centers 
CALS comprises 17 academic departments and 14 Centers.

Agricultural and Applied Economics - The Department of Agricultural and Applied Economics at the University of Wisconsin-Madison was the first such specialized department in the world. Growing from its original focus on issues of land, forests and farm management.

Agronomy - Agronomy is the science and practice of growing plants that feed the world and doing it in a way that improves the planet. Students, staff, and faculty conduct research and teaching on ways to produce crops that feed the world, while promoting biodiversity, building soil, improving water resources and sequestering carbon.

Animal Sciences - Animal Sciences fosters scientific discoveries in animal agriculture and biology, inspire original thinking and the art of discovery through innovative education and service, thereby enriching the lives of students, scientists, and society.

Life Sciences Communication  - The Department of Life Sciences Communication offers bachelor’s, master’s, and doctoral education focusing on applied and theoretical problems in communicating about science, health, the environment, agriculture, and the biological sciences in an era of rapid technological change and media convergence.

See also
Farm and Industry Short Course (FISC)
Wisconsin Agricultural Experiment Station

References

Notes

External links
 Official website

Agricultural and Life Sciences, College of
Educational institutions established in 1889
Wisconsin

1889 establishments in Wisconsin